Vasif Asadov (born 27 August 1965) is a retired male triple jumper who represented the Soviet Union and later Azerbaijan. He won bronze medals at the 1988 European Indoor Championships in Budapest and the 1995 Asian Championships in Jakarta. He competed for Azerbaijan at the 1996 Summer Olympics, without reaching the final. His personal best results was 17.33 metres, achieved in June 1990 in Bryansk.

Achievements

External links

1965 births
Living people
Soviet male triple jumpers
Azerbaijani male triple jumpers
Athletes (track and field) at the 1996 Summer Olympics
Olympic athletes of Azerbaijan